Chiricahua (also known as Chiricahua Apache) is a Southern Athabaskan language spoken by the Chiricahua people in Chihuahua and Sonora, México and in Oklahoma and New Mexico. It is related to Navajo and Western Apache and has been described in great detail by the anthropological linguist Harry Hoijer (1904–1976), especially in Hoijer & Opler (1938) and Hoijer (1946). Hoijer & Opler's Chiricahua and Mescalero Apache Texts, including a grammatical sketch and traditional religious and secular stories, has been converted into an online "book" available from the University of Virginia.

Virginia Klinekole, the first female president of the Mescalero Apache Tribe, was known for her efforts to preserve the language.

There is at least one language-immersion school for children in Mescalero.

Phonology

Consonants
Chiricahua has 31 consonants:

Vowels
Chiricahua has 16 vowels:

Chiricahua has phonemic  oral, nasal, short, and long vowels.

References

Sources

 Hoijer, Harry. (n.d.). Chiricahua Apache stems. (Unpublished manuscript).
 Hoijer, Harry.  (1938).  The southern Athapaskan languages.  American Anthropologist, 40 (1), 75-87.
 Hoijer, Harry.  (1939).  Chiricahua loan-words from Spanish.  Language, 15 (2), 110-115.
 Hoijer, Harry.  (1945).  Classificatory verb stems in the Apachean languages.  International Journal of American Linguistics, 11 (1), 13-23.
 Hoijer, Harry.  (1945).  The Apachean verb, part I: Verb structure and pronominal prefixes.  International Journal of American Linguistics, 11 (4), 193-203.
 Hoijer, Harry.  (1946).  The Apachean verb, part II: The prefixes for mode and tense.  International Journal of American Linguistics, 12 (1), 1-13.
 Hoijer, Harry.  (1946).  The Apachean verb, part III: The classifiers.  International Journal of American Linguistics, 12 (2), 51-59.
 Hoijer, Harry.  (1946).  Chiricahua Apache.  In C. Osgood (Ed.), Linguistic structures in North America.  New York: Wenner-Green Foundation for Anthropological Research.
 Hoijer, Harry; & Opler, Morris E.  (1938).  Chiricahua and Mescalero Apache texts.  The University of Chicago publications in anthropology; Linguistic series.  Chicago: University of Chicago Press.  (Reprinted in 1964 by Chicago: University of Chicago Press; in 1970 by Chicago: University of Chicago Press; & in 1980 under H. Hoijer by New York: AMS Press).
 Opler, Morris E., & Hoijer, Harry.  (1940). The raid and war-path language of the Chiricahua Apache.  American Anthropologist, 42 (4), 617-634.
 Pinnow, Jürgen. (1988). Die Sprache der Chiricahua-Apachen: Mit Seitenblicken auf das Mescalero [The language of the Chiricahua Apache: With side glances at the Mescalero]. Hamburg: Helmut Buske Verlag.
Webster, Anthony K. (2006). On Speaking to Him (Coyote): The Discourse Functions of the yi-/bi- Alternation in Some Chiricahua Apache Narratives. Southwest Journal of Linguistics, 25(2), 143-160.
 Young, Robert W.  (1983).  Apachean languages.  In A. Ortiz, W. C. Sturtevant (Eds.), Handbook of North American Indians: Southwest, (Vol. 10), (p. 393-400).  Washington: Smithsonian Institution.  .

External links
 Chiricahua and Mescalero Apache Texts
 OLAC resources in and about the Mescalero-Chiricahua Apache language

 

Southern Athabaskan languages
Chiricahua
Indigenous languages of Oklahoma
Indigenous languages of Mexico
Indigenous languages of New Mexico
Native American language revitalization
Endangered Athabaskan languages
Mescalero Apache
Languages of Mexico